Pyropelta bohlei is a species of small sea snail, a deep-water limpet, a marine gastropod mollusk in the family Pyropeltidae.

Habitat 
This small limpet occurs at hydrothermal vents and seeps.

References

Pyropeltidae
Gastropods described in 1996